Poção is a city located in the state of Pernambuco, Brazil. Located  at 241 km away from Recife, capital of the state of Pernambuco. Has an estimated (IBGE 2020) population of 11,305 inhabitants.

Geography
 State - Pernambuco
 Region - Agreste Pernambucano
 Boundaries - Paraiba state   (N);  Pesqueira    (S and W);  Jataúba   (E).
 Area - 199.74 km2
 Elevation - 1000 m
 Hydrography - Capibaribe and Ipojuca rivers
 Vegetation - Caatinga Hipoxerófila
 Climate - Semi arid
 Annual average temperature - 19.5 c
 Distance to Recife - 241 km

Economy
The main economic activities in Poção are based in agribusiness, especially beans, corn; and livestock such as cattle, sheep, goats and poultry.

Economic indicators

Economy by Sector
2006

Health indicators

References

Municipalities in Pernambuco